This is a list of the Spring 1980 PGA Tour Qualifying School graduates.

Source:

References 

1980 1
PGA Tour Qualifying School
PGA Tour Qualifying School